Bill Potts is a fictional character created by Steven Moffat and portrayed by Pearl Mackie in the long-running British science fiction television series Doctor Who. In the show's tenth series, starting with the first episode, Bill served as a companion of the Twelfth Doctor, an incarnation of the alien time traveller known as the Doctor (portrayed by Peter Capaldi).

Appearances

Television
Bill Potts is introduced in the tenth series premiere, "The Pilot". In their first encounter, Bill is discovered by the Doctor, who is hiding out as a university professor. Noticing her untapped potential, he offers to privately tutor her. However, when Bill's love interest Heather (Stephanie Hyam) is turned into a water creature that can travel anywhere in space and time, the Doctor reveals to Bill his alien nature and takes her on as his travelling companion, much to the chagrin of his assistant Nardole (Matt Lucas), who urges the Doctor to stay in Bristol and keep watch over a strange safe below the university.

In subsequent episodes, Bill learns about the Doctor's Time Lord nature and the rules of time travel, averting alien invasions and ending conflicts on faraway planets and deep space, growing closer to the Doctor all the while. In the series finale, "World Enough and Time" / "The Doctor Falls", Bill is shot through the heart after the Doctor's crew reacts to an alien distress call aboard a spaceship, and is carried away by menacing scientists to a lower deck where time moves much more rapidly. Bill's life is saved, but ten years pass before the Doctor is able to reach her, during which time she is converted into a Cyberman. Though Cybermen are normally emotionless and hellbent on converting humans to their ranks, Bill retains her humanity and sense of identity as a result of particular experiences she has had travelling with the Doctor. When the Cybermen are defeated, Bill is entirely alone: the Doctor appears dead, Nardole has taken Mondasian refugees to safety, and she is a horrific monster. She is rescued, however, by Heather, who transforms her into a creature like herself and offers Bill the choice of travelling space and time together, or being returned to her life on Earth as a normal, living human again. Bill returns the Doctor's body to the TARDIS, and bids him a sad farewell, before taking off with Heather to explore the universe. Mackie makes a final appearance in "Twice Upon a Time" as a living avatar of Bill's memories, collected on her death by the Testimony Project. Recognising herself as a continuation of Bill, she is delighted to see the Doctor again, and helps him on his journey to accept he must regenerate again.

Other media
In April 2017, three new novels were released, featuring new companions Nardole and Bill Potts. They are titled The Shining Man, Diamond Dogs and Plague City. Before her premiere episode was broadcast, Bill made a cameo appearance in a Doctor Who Magazine comic strip, titled "The Daft Dimension", alongside Nardole in Issue #511 (May 2017).

Paul Cornell's novelisation of "Twice Upon a Time" reveals more details about Bill's experiences following the events of "The Doctor Falls". It states that Bill and Heather explore the Milky Way together for a time, until Bill suggests they try being human again. As they spend time together on Earth – magicking up enough money to rent a flat and adopting cats – Bill grows to know and love Heather as a person. Years later, they decide to live by the sea and grow old as humans. On her deathbed, Bill tells Heather to leave her and resume her astral form. After accepting a human death, Bill finds herself part of Testimony. When it encounters the Doctor, Testimony temporarily restricts Bill's access to some of her memories so that she can interact with the Doctor as he knew her, to test his trustworthiness; this limitation is lifted at the end of the story.

Casting and development

In April 2016, it was announced that Pearl Mackie would portray the newest companion Bill Potts, after the departure of Jenna Coleman. To avoid leaks while casting the new companion, the production team used the word "Mean Town", an anagram of "Ten Woman"; this is a reference to the fact that Bill is the companion in the tenth series, and was revealed by the casting director Andy Pryor to Radio Times. Producer Steven Moffat said Mackie's ethnicity was a factor in the decision to cast her, as he wanted to make the cast more diverse: "We decided that the new companion was going to be non-white [...] because we need to do better on that". Bill is also the show's first openly gay companion.

A preview scene was filmed in April 2016 as part of a promotional clip shown on 23 April 2016 on BBC One, during the semi-final half-time of the 2015–16 FA Cup. Titled "Friend from the Future", it introduced Bill and the Doctor in an encounter with Daleks. Despite initial doubts that this scene would be included in the series itself, parts of it were incorporated into Mackie's debut episode, "The Pilot".

Mackie describes Bill as "cool, really fun and really excited", and that she is "really young and doesn't really know much about the world". Capaldi describes her character as coming into the series as "very much as a regular human being from the real world, to whom all of this stuff is extraordinary, she knows nothing about it". Bill challenges the Doctor in his ways, calling him out on issues that he hasn't faced in a long time, and having a curious mind, she asks him continuous questions.

On 23 July 2017, a trailer for the 2017 Christmas special "Twice Upon a Time" was released revealing Mackie's involvement in that episode. On the same day, Mackie officially announced at San Diego Comic-Con that she would not be returning for the eleventh series.

Though the character shares a name with William "Bill" Hartnell, who played the First Doctor (and whose wife, like Bill's girlfriend, was named Heather), creator Steven Moffat has said that this was a coincidence. The character's name was in fact inspired when Moffat overheard David Tennant, who portrayed the Tenth Doctor, offhandedly call out to Billie Piper by the name Bill on the set of "The Day of the Doctor" in 2013.

Reception
Before the episode was broadcast, an advanced screening was given for critics. General reviews for Mackie's character were mixed. Following the broadcast of her first episode, the character was received more positively.

Patrick Mulkern of Radio Times described Pearl Mackie as "instantly winning as fledgling companion Bill". Den of Geek's Simon Brew also gave a positive review of Mackie, praising the humour in Mackie's performance. Alasdair Wilkins of The A.V. Club said Mackie brought "an energy distinct from any previous new series companion" and called her first appearance a "solid introduction". Wilkins also commented on the character that "she is gay, black, and working class is another welcome step in Doctor Who’s ability to reflect the entire spectrum of who enjoy the show and identify with its characters".

However, Catherine Gee of The Telegraph gave a more negative review, saying Mackie in her premiere episode "lacked the charismatic spark of Jenna Coleman" and said Mackie's character was a "muddle", but praised the fact Mackie's character was not middle-class.

References

External links

 Bill Potts at the BBC One Doctor Who website
 Bill Potts at the BBC Worldwide Doctor Who website

Doctor Who companions
British female characters in television
Adoptee characters in television
Fictional Black British people
Television characters introduced in 2016
Fictional English people
Fictional LGBT characters in television
Fictional lesbians
Fictional waiting staff